The 2019–20 Liga IV Satu Mare was the 52nd season of Liga IV Satu Mare, the fourth tier of the Romanian football league system. The season began on 23 August 2019 and was scheduled to end in June 2020, but was suspended in March because of the COVID-19 pandemic in Romania. 

On 2 June 2020, AJF Satu Mare (County Football Association) announced that a promotion play-off tournament between the first 2 ranked teams in each zones will be played to decide the county champion and the team that will qualify for the promotion play-off to Liga III.

The season was ended officially on 24 July 2020 when AJF Satu Mare concluded that the teams cannot comply with the conditions imposed by the medical protocol and decided to declare Satu Mare the county champion and the team that qualify at the promotion play-off.

Team changes

To Liga IV Satu Mare
Relegated from Liga III
 Unirea Tășnad
Promoted from Liga V Satu Mare
 Olimpia MCMXXI Satu Mare
 Voința Turț

From Liga IV Satu Mare
Promoted to Liga III
 Satu Mare
Relegated to Liga V Satu Mare
 Atletic Craidorolț
 Egri Sasok Agriș

Other changes
 Satu Mare was excluded from Liga III by the Romanian Football Federation remaining in Liga IV.

Competition format
The league consists of 38 teams divided into three zones. Tur-Talna Zone and Someș Zone with 12 teams and Crasna Zone with 14 teams. The teams ranked 2nd in each series and the best team in the third place qualify for the semi-final tournament, and the winner will qualify for the championship final four.

League tables

Tur-Talna Zone

Someș Zone

Crasna Zone

Promotion play-off

Champions of Liga IV – Satu Mare face champions of Liga IV – Cluj County and Liga IV – Bihor County.

Region 2 (North–West)

Group A

See also

Main Leagues
 2019–20 Liga I
 2019–20 Liga II
 2019–20 Liga III
 2019–20 Liga IV

County Leagues (Liga IV series)

 2019–20 Liga IV Alba
 2019–20 Liga IV Arad
 2019–20 Liga IV Argeș
 2019–20 Liga IV Bacău
 2019–20 Liga IV Bihor
 2019–20 Liga IV Bistrița-Năsăud
 2019–20 Liga IV Botoșani
 2019–20 Liga IV Brăila
 2019–20 Liga IV Brașov
 2019–20 Liga IV Bucharest
 2019–20 Liga IV Buzău
 2019–20 Liga IV Călărași
 2019–20 Liga IV Caraș-Severin
 2019–20 Liga IV Cluj
 2019–20 Liga IV Constanța
 2019–20 Liga IV Covasna
 2019–20 Liga IV Dâmbovița
 2019–20 Liga IV Dolj 
 2019–20 Liga IV Galați
 2019–20 Liga IV Giurgiu
 2019–20 Liga IV Gorj
 2019–20 Liga IV Harghita
 2019–20 Liga IV Hunedoara
 2019–20 Liga IV Ialomița
 2019–20 Liga IV Iași
 2019–20 Liga IV Ilfov
 2019–20 Liga IV Maramureș
 2019–20 Liga IV Mehedinți
 2019–20 Liga IV Mureș
 2019–20 Liga IV Neamț
 2019–20 Liga IV Olt
 2019–20 Liga IV Prahova
 2019–20 Liga IV Sălaj
 2019–20 Liga IV Sibiu
 2019–20 Liga IV Suceava
 2019–20 Liga IV Teleorman
 2019–20 Liga IV Timiș
 2019–20 Liga IV Tulcea
 2019–20 Liga IV Vâlcea
 2019–20 Liga IV Vaslui
 2019–20 Liga IV Vrancea

References

External links
 Official website 

Liga IV seasons
Sport in Satu Mare County